The Minot Why Nots were a minor league baseball team based in Minot, North Dakota, United States that played in the Northern League in 1917.

References
Ballparkwatch Northern League history
An Informal History of the Northern League by Herman D. White

Defunct minor league baseball teams
Minot, North Dakota
Professional baseball teams in North Dakota
1917 in North Dakota
Defunct baseball teams in North Dakota
Baseball teams disestablished in 1917
Baseball teams established in 1917